Doug Lambert is a former Scottish international lawn and indoor bowls player.

Lambert (born 1946) won a silver medal in the triples and a bronze medal in the fours at the 1984 World Outdoor Bowls Championship in Aberdeen.

He played for the Bridge of Earn club in Perthshire.

References

Scottish male bowls players
1947 births
Living people